Palmer is a rural locality in the Shire of Cook, Queensland, Australia.

The former towns (now unbounded localities) of Byerstown, Lukinville, Maytown, Palmerville and Stonyville (or Stony Creek), all dating from the 1870s-1880s gold rushes around the Palmer River, are within the locality.

Geography
The Palmer River which flows through the locality from east to west. The Palmer River Goldfields Resource Reserve is the eastern part of the locality to the north of the river.

History
Kuku Yalanji  (also known as Gugu Yalanji, Kuku Yalaja, and Kuku Yelandji) is an Australian Aboriginal language of the Mossman and Daintree areas of  North Queensland. The language region includes areas within the local government area of Shire of Douglas and Shire of Cook, particularly the localities of Mossman, Daintree, Bloomfield River, China Camp, Maytown, Palmer, Cape Tribulation and Wujal Wujal.

Yalanji  (also known as Kuku Yalanji, Kuku Yalaja, Kuku Yelandji, and Gugu Yalanji) is an Australian Aboriginal language of Far North Queensland. The traditional language region is Mossman River in the south to the Annan River in the north, bordered by the Pacific Ocean in the east and extending inland to west of Mount Mulgrave. This includes the local government boundaries of the Shire of Douglas, the Shire of Cook and the Aboriginal Shire of Wujal Wujal and the towns and localities of Cooktown,  Mossman, Daintree, Cape Tribulation and Wujal Wujal. It includes the head of the Palmer River, the Bloomfield River, China Camp, Maytown, and Palmerville.

The locality takes its name from the Palmer River which flows through the locality from east to west and the Palmer goldfields around the river. The river was named on 5 August 1872 by William Hann after Arthur Hunter Palmer, then Premier of Queensland.

Heritage listings 
Palmer has a number of heritage-listed sites, including:
 Conglomerate Range: Wild Irish Girl Mine and Battery
 Laura to Maytown: Laura to Maytown Coach Road
 Maytown Town Reserve: Maytown Township
 Palmerville Station: Alexandra Mine and Battery
 Stony Creek: Stonyville Township
 Strathleven: Palmer River Gold Company Dredge

Attractions
The Palmer River Goldfield Resource Reserve has old gold mines, rusting machinery, and some traces of the Maytown township for the visitor to explore.

References

External links

 

 
Shire of Cook
Localities in Queensland